Mon Alvin T. Abundo (born October 29, 1992) is a Filipino professional basketball player for the Davao Occidental Tigers of the Pilipinas Super League (PSL). He was Blackwater’s seventh round pick (51st overall) in the 2015 PBA draft, making him the lowest-drafted player ever to make it to the PBA.

PBA career statistics

As of the end of 2021 season

Season-by-season averages
 
|-
| align=left | 
| align="left" rowspan="4" | Star / Magnolia
| 19 || 5.3 || .468 || .423 || .333 || .8 || .5 || .2 || .0 || 3.0
|-
| align=left | 
| 8 || 4.5 || .350 || .222 || — || 1.0 || .4 || .1 || .0 || 2.0
|-
| align=left | 
| 16 || 4.1 || .308 || .222 || .500 || .9 || .7 || .1 || .0 || 1.3
|-
| align=left | 
| 4 || 4.4 || .167 || .250 || — || .8 || 1.0 || .0 || .0 || .8
|-
| align=left | 
| align=left | NorthPort
| 3 || 1.9 || — || — || .500 || 1.0 || .0 || .0 || .0 || .3
|-class=sortbottom
| align=center colspan=2 | Career
| 50 || 4.5 || .384 || .316 || .400 || .9 || .6 || .1 || .0 || 2.0

References

1992 births
Living people
Basketball players from Metro Manila
Blackwater Bossing draft picks
Centro Escolar University alumni
CEU Scorpions basketball players
Filipino men's basketball players
Magnolia Hotshots players
People from Parañaque
Point guards
Tagalog people
Maharlika Pilipinas Basketball League players
NorthPort Batang Pier players